The Faroe Islands national handball team is the national handball team of Faroe Islands and is controlled by the Handball Federation of the Faroe Islands.

In June 2015, Faroe Islands competed in the 2015 IHF Emerging Nations Championship, and won the championship. In June 2017, Faroe Islands competed in the 2017 IHF Emerging Nations Championship, and once again won the championship. At the 2019 edition, unlike the previous ones, Europe was represented only by the teams who competed at the first phase of 2022 European Championship qualification and failed to advance to the Relegation Round. That implied Faroe Islands not to defend their title.

IHF Emerging Nations Championship record
2015 – 1st place
2017 – 1st place

Current squad
As of 5 May 2021:

Goalkeeper
Tórður Guttesen, Odder Håandbold
Nicholas Satchwell, KA Akureyri
Eli Gærdum, STÍF
Tóraldur Kollsker, H71

Left wing
Rói Berg Hansen, HØJ
Leivur Mortensen, Ajax København
Jóhan Í Garðastova, VÍF
Sjúrður Olsen, VÍF
Høgni Zachariasen, HEI/Skæring

Back
Hans Eli Sigurðbjørnsson, KÍF
Peter Krogh, H71
Brandur Halgirsson, Ajax København
Jónas G. Djurhuus, Viking Stavanger
Áki Egilsnes, KA Akureyri
Kjartan Johansen, Viking Stavanger
Teis Horn Rasmussen, TM Tønder
Sámal á Tjaldrafløtti, Team Klaksvík
Vilhelm Poulsen, FRAM
Filip Jojic, VÍF
Fríði Hammer Weyhe, KÍF
Rani Højgaard, KÍF
Elias Ellefsen á Skipagøtu, IK Savehof
Julian Kragesteen, Neistin
Tróndur Mikkelsen, SUS Nyborg
Dánjal Ragnarson, Neistin

Pivot
Rógvi Dal Christiansen, FRAM
Rókur Akralíð, HEI/Skæring
Helgi Hildarson Hoydal, Viking Stavanger
Pætur Mikkjalson, SUS Nyborg
Niklas Højgaard Hanusarson, H71

Right wing
Allan Norðberg, KA Akureyri
Nicklas Selvig, KÍF
Pætur Thomsen, H71
Hákun West av Teigum

References

External links
Official website
IHF profile
 

Men's national handball teams
Handball in the Faroe Islands
Handball